The 1955 Holy Cross Crusaders football team was an American football team that represented the College of the Holy Cross as an independent during the 1955 college football season. In its 12th year under head coach Eddie Anderson, the team compiled a 6–4 record. 

The team played its home games at Fitton Field on the college's campus in Worcester, Massachusetts.

Schedule

Statistical leaders 
Statistical leaders for the 1955 Crusaders included:
 Rushing: Dick Surrette, 286 yards on 69 attempts
 Passing: Jack Stephans, 554 yards, 35 completions and 5 touchdowns on 89 attempts
 Receiving: Carlin Lynch, 290 yards and 2 touchdowns on 23 receptions
 Scoring: Dave Hohl, 42 points on 12 PATs
 Total offense: Jack Stephans, 653 yards (554 passing, 99 rushing)
 All-purpose yards: Dave Hohl, 180 yards (214 receiving, 180 rushing)

References

Holy Cross
Holy Cross Crusaders football seasons
Holy Cross Crusaders football